Charles Jeffers (1871 – October 13, 1939 ) was an American sports shooter. He competed in the 1000 yard free rifle event at the 1908 Summer Olympics.

References

1871 births
1939 deaths
American male sport shooters
Olympic shooters of the United States
Shooters at the 1908 Summer Olympics
Place of birth missing